Albert Gran (August 4, 1862 – December 16, 1932) was a Norwegian-born American stage and film actor. He is most associated with his appearance in drama and light comedy films.

Biography
Albert Gran was born in Bergen, Norway. He was the son of Albert Nicolai Gran (1838-1915) and Auguste Schwarting (1844-1910). He emigrated to the United States during 1914. Gran launched his screen career in 1916. He appeared as a character actor in 44 films between 1916 and 1933. He was seen as Duke Travina with  Marion Davies in Beverly of Graustark (1926), as Paul Boul with Janet Gaynor in Seventh Heaven (1927), and as B. Bickering Brown with Joan Crawford in Our Modern Maidens (1929). Albert Gran died in Los Angeles, California in an automobile accident at the age of 70 prior to the release of his final film.

Partial filmography
Out of the Drifts (1916)
Where Love Leads (1916)
Caprice of the Mountains (1916)
Civilian Clothes (1920)
Tarnish (1924)
Graustark (1925)
Beverly of Graustark (1926)
 Early to Wed (1926)
 More Pay, Less Work (1926)
 Honesty – The Best Policy (1926)
Seventh Heaven (1927)
Breakfast at Sunrise (1927)
Four Sons (1928)
The Blue Danube (1928)
Mother Knows Best (1928) Fox's first full talkie
Dry Martini (1928)
 We Americans (1928)
 Geraldine (1929)
Gold Diggers of Broadway (1929)
Our Modern Maidens (1929)
Tanned Legs (1929)
The Little Accident (1930)
The Brat (1931)
Command Performance (1931)
Beauty Parlor (1932)
Employees' Entrance (1932) (Gran died in an auto accident before the film was finished and released)

References

External links

1862 births
1932 deaths
American male film actors
American male silent film actors
Norwegian emigrants to the United States
Actors from Bergen
Road incident deaths in California
20th-century American male actors